Andrew Shives is the former bassist of the industrial metal group Fear Factory between 1992 and 1993. His photo appeared on the Soul of a New Machine album jacket, but he didn't play on the album (Dino Cazares played all bass tracks). In 1993 Fear Factory released a 7" single under their Spanish name Factoría De Miedo called Sangre De Niños. This is the only material that was ever recorded in a studio with Andrew Shives on bass. He was forced to leave the band due to some internal disputes and was replaced by Christian Olde Wolbers. He then played for Cool for August for some years, and is now in a band called Paperstreet which is based in Atlanta, Georgia.

References

Year of birth missing (living people)
Living people
American bass guitarists
Alternative metal bass guitarists
Fear Factory members
Industrial metal musicians